The Ajax, formerly known as the Scout SV (Specialist Vehicle), is a group of armoured fighting vehicles being developed by General Dynamics UK for the British Army. It has suffered serious development and production difficulties.

The Ajax is a development of the ASCOD armoured fighting vehicles used by the Spanish Armed Forces and Austrian Armed Forces. The vehicles were originally developed by Steyr-Daimler-Puch Spezialfahrzeug and Santa Bárbara Sistemas in the early 1990s. Both companies were purchased by General Dynamics in the early 2000s.

In 2010, General Dynamics UK was selected as the winner of the Future Rapid Effect System contract with the ASCOD Common Base Platform, beating BAE Systems' CV90 proposal. The Ajax vehicles will be procured in a number of variants, initially planned to be in blocks, with the first vehicles planned to be delivered in 2017. Delays meant that as of January 2020, initial operating capability was expected in July 2020.

In November 2020, trials were halted over excessive noise and vibration. In September 2021 Jeremy Quin, Minister for Defence Procurement, in a written response stated that dynamic testing and training on Ajax was suspended and that "it is not possible to determine a realistic timescale for the introduction of Ajax vehicles into operational service". Limited trials resumed in October 2022, with extended trials to last possibly until early 2025.

Development 

The Ajax has its origins in the Future Rapid Effect System programme going back to the 1990s when the joint UK/USA TRACER programme was cancelled. The purpose of the FRES programme was to find a replacement for the British Army's Combat Vehicle Reconnaissance (Tracked) (CVR(T)) family of vehicles, which have been in service from 1971. General Dynamics UK won the contract in March 2010 after years of competition from BAE Systems. After the Ministry of Defence had selected the ASCOD 2 Common Base Platform, BAE tried to reverse the decision by offering to manufacture the CV90 at their Newcastle facility. Nevertheless, the Ministry of Defence awarded General Dynamics a £500 million Demonstration Phase contract. General Dynamics has conducted design review work using the input of soldiers and bringing the ASCOD 2 Chassis in line with the British requirements.

The Ajax programme passed the "Preliminary Design Review" (PDR), initial design point in December 2012. At this stage of development, system maturity and preliminary system design were reviewed. In late 2013, the "Common Base Platform Critical Design Review" (CDR) was completed and development continued. In June 2014, the Protected Mobility Reconnaissance Support (PMRS) variant of the Scout Family officially completed its CDR. A "Mobile Test Rig", the precursor to a prototype, which had been undergoing rigorous testing including cold weather and Operational and Tactical (O&T) mobility trials, as well as Accelerated Life Testing (ALT), completed system de-risking. At the DVD exhibition in 2014, the first pre-production prototype of the PMRS variant was unveiled, built at General Dynamics' facilities in Spain.

Initially, the Ajax was to be procured in a number of blocks totalling 1,010 vehicles. The first order of Block 1 vehicles encompassed Scout Reconnaissance, PMRS APC, and Repair and Recovery variants, with a following order of Block 2 to consist of Reconnaissance, C2, and Ambulance variants. There was a possibility for a third Block of vehicles encompassing a "Direct Fire" vehicle with a 120mm main gun, "Manoeuvre Support", and a "Joint Fires" variant equipped to succeed the FV102 Striker in the anti-tank role. However, in September 2014, Block 3 vehicles were dropped and the Ministry of Defence had "no plans" to order any Block 2 vehicles.

On 3 September 2014, the British Government ordered 589 Scout SV vehicles, totalling a cost of £3.5 billion excluding VAT. A number of Block 2 variants were merged into the Block 1 order.

The variants ordered include:

245 turreted 'Ajax' variants
198 Reconnaissance and Strike (Ajax)
23 Joint Fire Control (Ajax)
24 Ground Based Surveillance (Ajax)
256 Protected Mobility Recce Support (PMRS) variants
93 Armoured Personnel Carrier (APC) (Ares)
112 Command and Control (Athena)
34 Formation Reconnaissance Overwatch (Ares)
51 Engineer Reconnaissance (Argus)
88 Engineering variants for REME based on the PMRS
38 armoured recovery vehicles (Atlas) with three man crew
50 Repair vehicles (Apollo) with four man crew

Deliveries to the British Army began in 2017; the last deliveries were scheduled for around 2026.

In July 2015, the Ministry of Defence concluded their study into having final assembly of the Scout SV vehicles take place in the UK rather than General Dynamics' primary production facility in Spain. There was a business case for UK final assembly and testing. As part of a £390 million maintenance package running until 2024, General Dynamics moved production of the last 489 vehicles to Britain. General Dynamics bought a former forklift factory in Pentrebach in South Wales to assemble the Scout SV. Thales UK won the sight system contract for the Scout family, safeguarding engineering and manufacturing jobs at their site in Scotland.

In early August 2015, Rheinmetall of Germany was contracted to manufacture the Scout SV turrets. Meggitt was to manufacture the Scout SV ammunition handling system.

On 15 September 2015, Scout was renamed Ajax. The name Ajax applies to the family as a whole, but also to the turreted variant specifically. The reconnaissance support variant was named Ares after the Greek god of war; the command-and-control variant was named  after Athena; the equipment repair vehicle was named Apollo; the equipment recovery variant was named Atlas; and the engineering reconnaissance variant was named Argus.

In April 2016, the main cannon and chain gun were fired successfully. In December 2016 manned firing tests of the three machine guns which can be fitted to the Ares vehicle were successfully carried out.

Design

The Ajax is manufactured and designed by General Dynamics UK and General Dynamics Santa Bárbara Sistemas (Spain), with the new turret and fire control system fitted on the Reconnaissance variant being designed and manufactured by Lockheed Martin UK. Lockheed Martin is working closely with the Defence Support Group for turret manufacture and assembly as well as Rheinmetall. 75% of turret and CT40 work will be carried out in the UK. The Scout SV is also equipped with a state of the art ISTAR package with advanced sensors and space for further future growth. This advanced ISTAR package allows for automated search, tracking and detection, more than doubling stand-off range at which targets can be identified and tracked.

The Ajax has a 20 Gbit/s Ethernet intelligent open architecture, which enables it to capture, process and store six TBs of information gathered by the sensors. It can then share this data, be it images or other information, via a real-time integrated Bowman communication system as fitted to the Challenger 2. Power for these systems comes from a silent auxiliary power generator.

Eighty percent of the vehicle manufacture will be completed in the UK, with 70% of the supply chain companies UK-based. The Ajax family project supports 400 jobs at General Dynamics UK's two facilities at Merthyr Tydfil and Oakdale in South Wales, and an estimated further 4,000 jobs in the British supply chain.

Project progress 
Ordered in 2014, the first delivery was scheduled for 2017, while it was stated that the first British Army squadron "will be equipped by mid-2019" so that they could be deployed by the end of 2020. This was delayed due to design and testing problems. Test crews were required to wear noise cancelling headphones and be checked for hearing loss at the end of operations and the vehicles were unable to reverse over obstacles more than 20 centimeters high. As of March 2021, the British Army had taken deliveries of the Ares variant, whilst 12 Ajax variants are going through acceptance testing. In June 2021 it was revealed that trials of Ajax variants were halted from November 2020 to March 2021 due to excessive vibration and noise, leaving crews suffering from nausea, swollen joints and tinnitus. The excessive vibration while moving was also damaging electronic systems and preventing armament from stabilising. Suspension faults on the Ajax variant meant turrets could not fire while moving. The hulls were of inconsistent lengths and had non-parallel sides, which means the vibration problems do not manifest in a uniform manner making it exceedingly difficult to determine if vibration is from a fundamental design problem or build quality failures. A leaked report doubted whether the Ajax Armoured Vehicle programme would be delivered on time and within budget and suggested that there was a risk that the vehicles' credibility would be questioned by troops and morale impaired. General Dynamics UK refused to comment on the report.

In early 2021 MPs on the Defence Select Committee issued a report critical of the state of the Army's armoured vehicle programme—including Ajax—which had spent hundreds of millions of pounds with little to show for it. Some defence experts questioned whether Ajax would ever enter service, calling it "the Army's Nimrod MRA4" (an upgrade of which never entered service and was scrapped in 2010 at a cost of £3.8bn). The Times reported that in June 2021 the problems with noise and rough handling were so serious that trials involving the Ajax had been suspended. The paper quoted Francis Tusa, editor of Defence Analysis, concluding that the British Army, "are spending good money after bad for something that is arguably unfixable". On 20 July 2021, Minister for Defence Procurement Jeremy Quin told the Defence Select Committee that "we cannot be 100 per cent certain that [the salvation of the programme] can be achieved". On 15 December 2021, Quin updated the Parliament and stated that "We are commissioning a senior legal figure to look more deeply at Ajax, and not just health and safety; to examine the cultural and process flaws that it has highlighted. We will leave no stone unturned to learn these lessons." Quin also listed four key points for the review to consider, relating to safety concerns by MoD officials that were communicated to the manufacturer. In June 2022 a report by the UK parliament's Public Accounts Committee found that delays had been caused by a "litany of failures" and advised that the Ministry of Defence needed to either resolve the problems or scrap the project, to prevent the compromising of national security.

Limited User Validation Trials recommenced in October 2022, with a view to commencing Reliability Growth Trials in January 2023. On 21 December 2022, the Minister of State for the Ministry of Defence, Alex Chalk, stated that these trials could last from 18 to 24 months - a period that would mean the results of the trials would not be available until after the next UK General Election.

On 24 February 2023 Defence Secretary Ben Wallace described the programme as having "turned a corner" and being "back on track".

Operators
 – In development – 245 Ajax, 93 Ares, 112 Athena, 50 Apollo, 38 Atlas and 51 Argus ordered.

See also
 ASCOD
 Namer
 Tulpar (IFV)
 Bionix AFV
 Hunter AFV
 BMP-3
 Kurganets-25
 T-15 Armata
 CV-90
 Dardo IFV
 K21
 M2 Bradley
 Puma (IFV)
 Type 89
 Makran IFV
 KF-41 Lynx

References

External links
AJAX at generaldynamics.uk.com
AJAX at military-today.com
AJAX at ThinkDefence.co.uk
"The British Army’s Greek Tragedy", Dr. Jack Watling, RUSI 22 July 2021

Tracked armoured fighting vehicles
Armoured fighting vehicles of the United Kingdom
Armoured fighting vehicles of the post–Cold War period
Military vehicles introduced in the 2010s
General Dynamics land vehicles
United Kingdom defence procurement